Panicker was a honorary title conferred by the king of Travancore in kerala to distinguished hindu individuals. The National Commission of Backward Classes lists Kalari Panicker under the list of OBCs. 
They were well known as the masters of Kalari tradition, having their Nalpatheeradi Kalari (name derived from its area of 42 x 21 feet). They are the people who propagated and practised Kalaripayattu, the martial art form of Kerala.

History 

Kalaris in Kerala were established during different periods of time. The formation of Kerala is interlinked to the story of Parashurama. It is believed that Parashurama established 108 kalaris across Kerala. Several kalaris were established during the reign of Kulasekharas. In the 12th century towards the end of Perumal era, the present state of Kerala was divided into small autonomous provinces called Nadus and ruled by its own Kings. During the Kulasekhara rule and later the kings of Nadus brought in warriors from Tulu Nadu.

The Portuguese traveller Duarte Barbosa said that "They are the skillful men who teach this art Kalarippayattu, and they are called the Panickers: these are the captains in war." In Journal of the Epigraphical Society of India it, is given that "The teachers of martial arts in order to distinguish themselves from other Panikkars, named themselves as Vanma, Varma Panikkars, Other titles include a middle name of "Kalarikkal" (literally, 'of the kalari') generally following the name of the respective 'kalari' to which he/she belongs to

Meloot Panicker 
"Meloot is a prominent varma family in kerala (descendant of Chera dynasty ). During their dynasty period, Meloot family branched themselves into two formations - Ruling authority and Military authority. Henceforth the military authority Meloot Varmas were acknowledged as Panickers (warrior) and upheld the kingdom's shield and administration.  Varmas received principal royalty status from The Kingdom of Travancore Since 1827 for their service . They are chiefly known as Meloot Varma Panickers or Meloot Panickers." At present , Kalaripayattu is not practiced or followed in some of the Meloot families, yet they keep their tradition and heritage very close to them.

Cheerappanchira Panikkar
"Cheerappanchira is a noble Ezhava  tharavad renowned for its Kalari in Muhamma, Alappuzha District. Recently, the family Kalari was reopened and around 40 students are being trained in the martial art of Kalarippayattu. The former minister of Kerala, Susheela Gopalan, hails from the Cheerappanchira family. According to a mythology, Maalikapurathamma is the daughter of Cheerappanchira Panikkar who taught Kalaripayattu to Lord Ayyappa.

Mathur Panicker
'Mathur' is located in Nedumudi in Alappuzha district, the home of Mathur Panicker, the Nair General of the Chembakassery King.  The Mathur Temple and the Mathur Gallery  are there.  The place is famous for the arts of Kathakali and Velakali. Kunjan nambiar stayed at the Mathur temple for Bhajan and offered prayers to Bhagwati.  There are Padma Shri award winning artists including Mathur Govindan Kutty.  There is also references to Mathur Panikker in English and Dutch documents.  There is existing the pathinaru kettu of Mathur built entirely of wood.

Notable people
 Muloor S. Padmanabha Panicker, Malayalam poet and prominent social reformer
 Achyuta Panikkar, astronomer of Kerala
 Dinesh Panicker, film producer and actor
 Ayyappa Paniker, poet
 G.N.Panicker, literary figure 
 K. M. Panikkar (1895–1963), statesman and diplomat, professor, newspaper editor, historian and novelist 
 K. N. Panikkar (born 1936), historian
 Kadammanitta Ramakrishnan (born M. R. Ramakrishna Panicker), writer
 Kavalam Madhava Panikkar, diplomat and writer
 Kavalam Narayan Panikkar, dramatist and poet
 Kavalam Narayana Panicker, dramatist, theater director, and poet
 N. Kesava Panikkar, zoologist
 P. K. Narayana Panicker, former General Secretary and President of the Nair Service Society
 P. N. Panicker, father of the Library Movement 
 Prem Panicker, cricket journalist
Puthumana Panicker: Title held by the Padanair( head of army) from Puthumana family
Chandroth Panicker: Title held by the Padanair from Chandroth family, 15-year-old boy warrior chandroth chanthunni hailed from chandroth family
Kokat Panicker: Title held by the Padanair from Kokat family
Verkot Panicker: Title held by the Padanair from Verkot family
 Rahul Panicker, entrepreneur, president and co-founder of Embrace Innovations
 Renji Panicker, journalist, script writer, producer, actor, and director
 Niranam poets:
 Madhava Panikkar, one of the Niranam poets
 Rama Panikkar, one of the Niranam poets
 Sankara Panikkar, one of the Niranam poets

See also Panikkar

References

Titles in India